A National Guard Armory, National Guard Armory Building, or National Guard Readiness Center is any one of numerous  buildings of the U.S. National Guard where a unit trains, meets, and parades. A readiness center supports the training, administration, and logistics of National Guard units by providing assembly space, classrooms, weapons and protective personal equipment storage, and training space. Readiness centers can also be utilized as communal assembly areas, utilized by local organizations and governments.

History 
After World War II, the Section 5 Committee of the Office of the Chief of Staff, War Department, chaired by MG Milton Reckord, approved a policy of constructing National Guard armories using 75% federal and 25% state funding.  In 1968, the Army National Guard had 2,786 armories; in 2000 the Army National Guard had 3,166 armories in 2,679 communities. In 2009, the Kansas Adjutant General's Department announced it would be closing 18 of its then-56 National Guard armories "due to state budget cuts."  

A report to Congress in 2014 noted that some National Guard armories are in poor or failing condition, with "the average nationwide [Readiness Center] condition [being] fair, but bordering on poor…". The report noted that the $377 million annual expenditure for constructing and improving readiness centers would produce "major long-term risks," and recommended more than quadrupling annual funding to "get to green" on key performance indicators by completely transforming and modernizing the portfolio of readiness centers.

Crime
In the 20th century, a number of national guard armories were the target of burglaries and weapons theft.

Bonnie and Clyde acquired many of the weapons used for their crime sprees, such Browning Automatic Rifles, through theft from National Guard Armories.

Some of the burglaries were linked to radicalism, as in the case of Katherine Ann Power, who stole weapons from multiple armories in the 1970s. A particularly notable case in 1974 involved the theft of a huge arms cache from the Compton National Guard Armory in California, in which nearly 100 M-16 rifles and several rocket launchers were stolen. Several suspects were eventually arrested in 1975. The magnitude of this crime was considered analogous to most dangerous kind of terrorist threats.

In 1995, former soldier Shawn Nelson stole an M60A3 tank from a National Guard armory in San Diego and went on a rampage throughout the city until he was shot dead by police.

Specific armories in the United States

National Guard Armory (Batesville, Arkansas), listed on the NRHP in Arkansas
National Guard Armory Building (Searcy, Arkansas), formerly listed on the NRHP in White County, Arkansas
National Guard Armory (Mena, Arkansas), listed on the NRHP in Arkansas
National Guard Armory-Pine Bluff, Pine Bluff, Arkansas, listed on the NRHP in Arkansas
Fort Homer W. Hesterly Armory, Tampa, Florida, listed on the NRHP in Florida 
Old West Palm Beach National Guard Armory, West Palm Beach, Florida, listed on the NRHP in Florida
Villisca National Guard Armory, Villisca, Iowa, listed on the NRHP in Iowa
Minneapolis Armory, Minneapolis, Minnesota, listed on the NRHP in Minnesota
Kearney National Guard Armory, Kearney, Nebraska, listed on the NRHP in Buffalo County, Nebraska
Hoosick Falls Armory, Hoosick Falls, New York
Schenectady Armory, Schenectady, New York
National Guard Armory (Fort Mill, South Carolina), listed on the NRHP in South Carolina
The D.C. Armory, a multi-use facility adjacent to RFK Stadium in Washington, D.C.
National Guard Armory 127th Regiment Infantry Company G, Oconomowoc, Wisconsin, listed on the NRHP in Wisconsin

See also
 List of armories and arsenals in New York City and surrounding counties
 Drill hall
 Armory (military)

Notes

References

External links
 Installations+Environment, Journal of the Army National Guard, 2018
 The National Guard Bureau
 The National Guard Bureau Heritage Collection

National Guard (United States)
United States Army National Guard
United States Air National Guard